Locomotives of the Hull and Barnsley Railway.  The Hull and Barnsley Railway never manufactured any of its own locomotives, all being built elsewhere. The first types in use were of the design W. Kirtley (Locomotive Superintendent of the London, Chatham and Dover Railway) who was acting as a consultant. Matthew Stirling (son of Patrick Stirling of 'Stirling Single' fame) was the first and only Locomotive Superintendent of the H&BR during its independence, and he undertook the rebuilding of some of Mr. Kirtley's designs, as well as contracting the construction of his own designs to various builders. His locomotives were typically domeless, and many of the original Kirtley engines were also rebuilt without domes.

Kirtley's locomotives were painted black with grey lining. Matthew Stirling subtly modified the livery – using invisible green (black except in bright sunlight) produced from a 50:50 mixture of 'drop black' and 'brunswick green'. Lining was of broad stripes of blue (ultramarine) with red (vermilion) edges. The 2-4-0 and 0-6-0 tender locomotives procured by Kitley carried a small cursive monogram of the letters "HB&WRJR", other locomotives carried the initials "H&BR".

A total of 186 engines were operated by the Hull and Barnsley Railway. On merging into the North Eastern Railway, the locomotives were briefly renumbered by adding 3000 to the original number. Following the incorporation into the London and North Eastern Railway, the surviving locomotives were assigned numbers between 2405 and 2542, in no specific order. Most except the H&BR Class F3 (LNER Class N13) were withdrawn between 1930 and 1940, the B Class beginning withdrawal earlier in 1925. The last F3 was withdrawn in 1956.

See also
 Locomotives of the North Eastern Railway
 Locomotives of the London and North Eastern Railway

References

Sources
 , social history, posters, postcards, publications and other emphera associated with the H&BR, also King George Dock
, reprint, early history of the line, concise full description, references to early literature and periodical sources
, non technical description of all types with basic side plan drawings with dimensions, notes on livery and external appearance, numbering details and withdrawal dates

Scrapped locomotives